Jabez Jebasir Gnanapragasam   (30 July 1924 – 1 November 1997) was the 12th Anglican Bishop of Colombo, Sri Lanka.  He was educated at Trinity College, Kandy, read History at University of Ceylon and Theology at Bishop's College, Calcutta. He was married to Grace (24 February 1934 – 2 October 2019) from 1953 until his death in November 1997. His brother, Emmanuel was also an Anglican priest.

See also
Church of Ceylon
Anglican Bishop of Colombo
Anglican Diocese of Colombo

References

External links
 The Church of Ceylon (Anglican Communion)
 Anglican Church of Ceylon News

1924 births
1997 deaths
20th-century Anglican bishops in Asia
Anglican bishops of Colombo
Sri Lankan Anglican bishops
Sri Lankan Tamil priests
Alumni of Trinity College, Kandy